Laurel Run (also known as Laurel Run Creek) is a tributary of Mill Creek in Luzerne County, Pennsylvania, in the United States. It is designated as a Coldwater Fishery and part of it is inhabited by wild trout. Various mills were built on the stream in the 19th century and it was also historically used as a water supply. A number of bridges have also been built across it.

Course
Laurel Run begins on a mountain, called Rui Wang, in Bear Creek Township. It flows northeast for a few tenths of a mile before turning northwest and entering a deep valley. The stream then flows north-northwest for more than a mile, entering the borough of Laurel Run. It then enters another valley and turns northeast for a few miles, entering Plains Township. In Plains Township, it receives its only named tributary, Deep Hollow. The stream then turns north and begins flowing near Pennsylvania Route 115 as its valley becomes much narrower. After a short distance, it turns north-northeast and then turns west-northwest, passing through Meadow Run Lake and crossing Interstate 81/Pennsylvania Route 309 and Pennsylvania Route 115. A short distance further downstream, it crosses Pennsylvania Route 315 and enters Wilkes-Barre. After a few tenths of a mile, it turns east for several tenths of a mile. The stream then turns northwest and reaches its confluence with Mill Creek after a few tenths of a mile.

Tributaries
Laurel Run has one named tributary, which is known as Deep Hollow.

Hydrology

Geography and geology

There are outfalls on Laurel Run in several places: Trethaway Street, the Mill Street bridge, and the Scott Street bridge. It also has a retaining wall in some places. The stream flows between Wyoming Mountain and Wilkes-Barre Mountain for part of its course. It also flows through the Laurel Run Gap.

Watershed
The watershed encompasses much of the southern part of the watershed of Mill Creek. It occupies portions of Bear Creek Township, Plains Township, Laurel Run, and Wilkes-Barre. The mouth of the stream is in the United States Geological Survey quadrangle of Pittston. However, its source is in the quadrangle of Wilkes-Barre East.

Laurel Run is one of the major tributaries of Mill Creek.

History
Laurel Run was entered into the Geographic Names Information System on August 2, 1979. Its identifier in the Geographic Names Information System is 1179019.

Hezekaiah Parsons built a cloth-dressing mill on Laurel Run in the early 1800s, some time in or after 1813. John Holgate constructed a turning-mill on the stream in 1832. Jehoida P. Johnson constructed a small gristmill on Laurel Run in 1817. During part of the 1820s, it also operated alongside a distillery. The mill was expanded in 1843 and a powder mill nearby was built in 1844. However, the powder mill exploded in 1848 and destroyed the mill, which was never rebuilt.

The 1909 book A History of Wilkes-Barré, Luzerne County, Pennsylvania described Laurel Run as being "of considerable size and importance up to about thirty years ago". However, in modern times, it is a "trickling flow of water". Historically, the stream was used as a water supply by the Wilkes-Barre Water Company.

A concrete slab bridge carrying State Route 2020/Scott Street was built over Laurel Run in 1929. A concrete culvert bridge carrying Interstate 81 over the stream was built in 1963. Another bridge of the same type, but with two spans, was built over the stream in 1991. Another two-span concrete culvert bridge was built over the stream in Wilkes-Barre in 1991.

Laurel Run experienced a flash flood in 2006, causing significant damage to areas such as Scott Street. A $2,000,000, six-phase cleanup project was later announced. The first phase of this cleanup effort was a $360,000 project done by the Slusser Brothers. In 2015, the Eastern Pennsylvania Coalition of Abandoned Mine Reclamation received a $5000 grant from the Coldwater Heritage Partnership to assess the effects of acid mine drainage and AML to Laurel Run and to study the stream's natural trout populations.

Biology
Laurel Run is designated as a Coldwater Fishery. Wild trout naturally reproduce in the stream in a stretch running from its headwaters to the Colebrook Dam.

See also
Gardner Creek, next tributary of Mill Creek going upstream
List of rivers of Pennsylvania

References

External links
Google Street View image of Laurel Run
The confluence of Laurel Run (right) with Mill Creek

Rivers of Luzerne County, Pennsylvania
Tributaries of the Susquehanna River
Rivers of Pennsylvania